Disaster Date is an American hidden camera TV-show on MTV in which actors go on a blind date with a person. The series premiered on September 28, 2009, ended on July 18, 2011 and was filmed in Los Angeles, California.

Premise
Each episode usually has three separate dates. Each blind date is set up by the participant's friend, who usually gives a back story about the participant, along with three things that they hate. From there, they go on a date with an undercover actor, who exhibits the three things that the participant hates. Each date lasts 60 minutes, and for every minute the person lasts, they earn one dollar. If they last for the entire date, they earn the full 60 dollars. If the participant walks out on the date early, or the date reaches 60 minutes, the actor will reveal the ruse and present them with the money.

A total of 13,404 dollars was awarded throughout the show's entirety, counting an additional 222 dollars given on four double dates.

Episodes

External links
 

2000s American game shows
2010s American game shows
2009 American television series debuts
2011 American television series endings
2000s American reality television series
2010s American reality television series
American dating and relationship reality television series
English-language television shows
MTV reality television series